Las Ovejas is a town located in Minas Department, in Neuquén Province, Argentina.

Geography 

Lagoons and Rivers
The Neuquén River and the Nahueve River flow near the town, and there is a group of lagoons called Epulaufquen lagoons.

Population 
In the 2001 census Las Ovejas recorded a population of 971 inhabitants, an increment of  42,5% after the 1991 census were recorded 685 inhabitants.

Tourism 
Las Ovejas is a growing touristic spot, the major attraction to the area is based on fishing in the lagoons few kilometers away from the town.
The local fish species in the lagoon are silverside, European perch, rainbow trout, and trout. The Mirador de la Puntilla is a located 6 kilometers from the town, a 120 m gateway where tourists can see the Neuquén river, the Cordillera del Viento (Wind Mountain range) and the  Domuyo volcano.

References

Populated places in Neuquén Province
Populated places established in 1937